Kala Chak is a village situated near Sook Khurd in the district of Gujrat, Pakistan.

References

Villages in Gujrat District